Doria's goshawk or Doria's hawk, (Megatriorchis doriae) is a raptor, the only member of the genus Megatriorchis.

Description
At up to 69 cm long, it is among the biggest hawks in the broad sense. It is greyish-brown with a black-barred crown and upperparts,  whitish underparts,  a black streak behind the eye, dark brown irises, a blackish bill and greenish-yellow legs. The sexes are similar. The female is slightly larger than the male.

Habitat and distribution
Doria's goshawk is endemic to lowland rainforests of New Guinea and Batanta Island. Its diet consists mainly of birds, including the lesser bird of paradise, and other small animals.

Conservation
Due to ongoing habitat loss, Doria's goshawk is evaluated as Near Threatened on the IUCN Red List of Threatened Species. It is listed on Appendix II of CITES.

Etymology
In the genus name, "Mega-" is from the Greek word for "big".  "Triorchis" was Greek for a kind of hawk thought to have three testicles — see Eutriorchis for details.  The species name commemorates the Italian naturalist Giacomo Doria.

References

External links 

 BirdLife Species Factsheet

Doria's goshawk
Birds of prey of New Guinea
Doria's goshawk